The 1st International Chopin Competition on Period Instruments - the inaugural edition of the International Chopin Competition in the piano class, which was held on September 2–14, 2018 in Warsaw on period instruments, organised by the Fryderyk Chopin Institute.

30 pianists from 9 countries were invited to participate in the competition. The auditions were divided into two stages, which took place on September 4–6 and September 8–10, and the final concerts lasted from September 12–13. The competition was won by Tomasz Ritter from Poland. The competition ended on September 14 the winners' concert.

Period piano instruments
The idea of the competition is to perform Chopin’s music on instruments it was composed for. Pianists could choose the piano they played during the competition from among five instruments selected by the jury. The Érard 1837 piano, which was chosen by 21 pianists, then followed by Pleyel 1842 - 19 pianists, the 1826 Buchholtz copy - 13 pianists and the 1819 Graf copy - 3 pianists (both by Paul McNulty), John Broadwood & Sons - 10 pianists. Unlike the International Chopin Piano Competition on contemporary instruments, the pianist could perform individual pieces on various instruments (maximum of three).

References

External links 
 http://iccpi.eu/en/competition/about/79 Official website dedicated to the competition.
 https://www.rhinegold.co.uk/international_piano/nifc/ An article about the competition.
Period Pianos - The Fryderyk Chopin Institute Collection
Videos of performances of participants of the contest

2018 music awards
Piano competitions
Music competitions